The following is a list of software packages and applications for biocybernetics research.

Data formats and specifications
 Systems Biology Markup Language (SBML)
 Biological Pathway Exchange (BioPAX)
 CellML
 Minimum Information About a Simulation Experiment (MIASE)
 Minimum information required in the annotation of models (MIRIAM)
 Systems Biology Ontology (SBO)
 Systems Biology Graphical Notation (SBGN)

Libraries for software development
 CyberUnits, a class library for computer simulations in life sciences

Software products
 SimThyr – Simulation system for thyroid homeostasis

See also 
 List of sequence alignment software
 List of open-source healthcare software
 List of open-source bioinformatics software
 List of proprietary bioinformatics software
 List of freeware health software
 List of molecular graphics systems
 List of systems biology modeling software
 Comparison of software for molecular mechanics modeling
 BioLinux

Other collections 
 PhysioToolkit Software Index: PhysioNet's software collection

References 

Biocybernetics
Cybernetics
Biomedical cybernetics
Systems biology